Joshua Farris (born January 6, 1995) is a former American competitive figure skater. He is the 2015 Four Continents silver medalist, the 2013 World Junior champion, a two-time Junior Grand Prix Final medalist (silver in 2012, bronze in 2011), and the 2010 U.S. national junior silver medalist. He won five Junior Grand Prix titles, as well as U.S. national titles on the juvenile (2006), intermediate (2008) and novice level (2009).

Personal life 
Joshua Farris was born in Renton, Washington to father Rodney. At the age of eight, he was diagnosed with dyslexia, which may be connected with a concussion he sustained as a child. He also has a severe allergy to dairy products and travels with a whole suitcase of food.

Farris was home-schooled. As of 2016, he planned to attend Pikes Peak Community College in Colorado Springs, Colorado. He has 4 siblings, 1 brother, a step brother (Josh), and 2 step sisters (Jessica, and Julie). His older brother, David, is a bowler.

Career

Early years 
Farris began skating at age five after his mother took him skating for his birthday. He moved to Colorado Springs, Colorado in mid-2007 to train with Tom Zakrajsek and Becky Calvin.

Farris won his third national title when he took the novice gold at the 2009 U.S. Championships. He was then sent to the 2009 International Challenge Cup in The Hague, Netherlands where he took silver on the junior level.

He made his ISU Junior Grand Prix debut in the following season. He was assigned to the 2009–10 ISU Junior Grand Prix events in the United States and Turkey where he placed 4th and 5th, respectively. At the 2010 U.S. Championships, he took silver on the junior level.

2010–11 season 
In the 2010–11 season, Farris was assigned the Junior Grand Prix events in Romania and the U.K. where he took silver and gold, respectively. This qualified him for the 2010-11 Junior Grand Prix Final where he placed 6th.

Farris decided to move up to the senior level nationally. At the 2011 U.S. Championships, Farris fell hard on his left hip while training a quad during the second day of practices. The fall resulted in a torn abductor muscle but he decided to compete despite the pain. He placed 13th after a shaky short program. On the day between the short and long programs Farris went to a restaurant and suffered anaphylactic shock due to his allergy to dairy products. He was rushed to the emergency room where he stayed until 3 a.m. He decided to compete in the long program where he had several shaky landings and three falls. He placed 21st in the free skate and overall. It was later learned that he had broken his fibula and sprained a tendon when he fell on his second triple Axel attempt. Following this competition, Farris decided to change coaches to Christy Krall, with whom he had already worked, and Damon Allen.

2011–12 season 
In the 2011–12 season, Farris was assigned to a Junior Grand Prix event in Gdańsk, Poland, which he won. He then took gold at his second event in Tallinn, Estonia, and qualified for the Junior Grand Prix Final where he won the bronze medal. He finished 16th on the senior level at the 2012 U.S. Championships. At the 2012 World Junior Championships, Farris won the short program and won the silver medal overall. He also won The Denver Post'''s Youth Excellence in Sports award for March 2012.

 2012–13 season 
In the 2012–13 season, Farris was assigned to JGP events in the U.S. and Slovenia — he took gold in both, resulting in qualification to the JGP Final in Sochi, Russia. At the JGP Final, he was first in the short program and second in the free skate and won the silver medal overall behind Russian skater Maxim Kovtun. Farris suffered from his milk allergies and took Benadryl two hours before the start of his free skate.

At the 2013 U.S. Championships Farris placed third in the short program. He fell on his planned quadruple toe loop in the long program, but managed to secure 4th place. He then won the gold medal at the 2013 World Junior Championships with an overall score of 228.32 points, finishing ahead of teammates Jason Brown and Shotaro Omori who were second and third respectively. Farris' score was a new record set for men competing on the junior level.

 2013–14 season: Senior debut 
In the 2013–14 season, Farris made his senior Grand Prix debut at the 2013 Skate Canada, where he finished 5th. He withdrew from his next assignment, the 2013 Cup of Russia.

At the 2014 U.S. Championships, Farris placed 4th again.

 2014–15 season 
In the 2014–15 season, Farris was assigned to 2014 Cup of China and 2014 NHK Trophy. However, he had to withdraw from the Cup of China due to a recurring right ankle injury, which had been a problem since 2011. At the NHK Trophy, he ended up 11th.

At the 2015 U.S. Championships, Farris won the bronze medal. In his free program, he executed a double toe jump three times, losing credit for one of his triple-jump combinations. Still his placement was an improvement from the previous year. At the 2015 Four Continents Championships, he set the personal best scores in both the short program and the free skating and won silver with total points of 260.01. This is his first medal in a prominent senior level international competition.  At the 2015 World Figure Skating Championships, he placed 11th.

 2015–16 season 
Farris' Grand Prix assignments were the 2015 Skate Canada International and 2015 NHK Trophy. However, he had to withdraw from both events after sustaining three concussions in three weeks. The first occurred when he fell while practicing a quadruple toe loop jump in July. Since a scan indicated nothing, he resumed training but then sustained a second concussion, followed soon after by a third when he hit his head entering a car. He did not compete during the season.

 Hiatus 
Farris announced his retirement from competitive skating on July 1, 2016 after struggling with the aftereffects of the concussions and depression. He resumed skating in early November 2016, after his health had improved, and announced in February 2017 that he hoped to return to competition in the 2017–18 season. He trained at the Broadmoor World Arena in Colorado Springs, Colorado, coached by Christy Krall and Damon Allen. However, the side effects from his brain injury did not go away, and he had to stop training again.

 Programs 

 Competitive highlights GP: Grand Prix; JGP: Junior Grand Prix 2008–09 to 2017–18 

 2004–05 to 2007–08 

Detailed resultsSmall medals for short and free programs awarded only at ISU Championships. Pewter medals for fourth-place finishes awarded only at U.S. national and regional events.''

Senior career

Junior career

References

External links 

 
 Joshua Farris at Ice Network
 

American male single skaters
Living people
Sportspeople from Renton, Washington
1995 births
World Junior Figure Skating Championships medalists
Four Continents Figure Skating Championships medalists